Căpreni is a commune in Gorj County, Oltenia, Romania. It is composed of eight villages: Aluniș, Brătești, Bulbuceni, Căpreni, Cetatea, Cornetu, Dealu Spirei and Satu Nou.

References

Communes in Gorj County
Localities in Oltenia